Santino Kenyi (born 14 August 1993) is a South Sudanese middle-distance runner. He competed in the 1500 metres event at the 2016 Summer Olympics, but was eliminated in the preliminary round.

References

External links
 

1993 births
Living people
South Sudanese male middle-distance runners
Olympic athletes of South Sudan
Athletes (track and field) at the 2016 Summer Olympics
South Sudanese male long-distance runners
South Sudanese male cross country runners